Patent Act and Patents Act (with their variations) are stock short titles used in Canada, India, Malaysia, New Zealand, the United Kingdom and the United States for legislation relating to patents.

A Patent Act is a country's legislation that controls the use of patents, such as the Patentgesetz in Germany.

List

Canada
 Patent Act

Germany
 German Patents Act

India
 The Patents Act, 1970

Malaysia
 The Patents Act 1983

New Zealand
 Patents Act 1860 (24 Vict No 14)
 The Patents Act 1953 (No 64) 
 The Patents Act 2013 (No 68)

United Kingdom
The Patents Act 2004 (c 16), amended the Patents Act 1977 to give effect to the European Patent Convention
The Copyright, Designs and Patents Act 1988 (c 48) 
The Patents, Designs and Marks Act 1986 (c 39)
The Patents Act 1977 (c 37), "the main law governing the patents system in the UK". It established "new domestic law" within the patents field.
The Patents and Designs (Renewals, Extensions and Fees) Act 1961 (9 & 10 Eliz 2 c 25)
The Patents Act 1957 (5 & 6 Eliz 2 c 13)
The Patents Act 1949 (12, 13 & 14 Geo 6 c 87)
The Patents and Designs Act 1949 (12, 13 & 14 Geo 6 c 62)
The Patents and Designs Act 1946 (9 & 10 Geo 6 c 44)
The Patents and Designs Act 1942 (5 & 6 Geo 6 c 6)
The Patents, Designs, Copyright and Trade Marks (Emergency) Act 1939 (2 & 3 Geo 6 c 107)
The Patents and Designs (Limits of Time) Act 1939 (2 & 3 Geo 6 c 32)
The Patents &c. (International Conventions) Act 1938 (1 & 2 Geo 6 c 29)
The Patents and Designs Act 1932 (22 & 23 Geo 5. c 32)
The Patents and Designs (Convention) Act 1928 (18 & 19 Geo 5 c 3)
The Patents and Designs Act 1919 (9 & 10 Geo 5 c 80)
The Patents and Designs Act 1914 (4 & 5 Geo 5 c 18)
The Patents and Designs Act 1907 (7 Edw 7 c 29)
The Patents and Designs (Amendment) Act 1907 (7 Edw 7 c 28)
The Patents Act 1902 (2 Edw 7 c 34)
The Patents Act 1901 (1 Edw 7 c 18)

The Patents, Designs, and Trade Marks Acts 1883 to 1888 was the collective title of the following Acts:
The Patents, Designs, and Trade Marks Act 1883 (46 & 47 Vict c 57)
The Patents, Designs, and Trade Marks (Amendment) Act 1885 (48 & 49 Vict c 63)
The Patents Act 1886 (49 & 50 Vict c 37)
The Patents, Designs, and Trade Marks Act 1888 (51 & 52 Vict c 50)

United States
 The term Patent Act may refer to United States patent law, as a whole, or to:
 Patent Act of 1790
 Patent Act of 1793
 Patent Act of 1836
 Patent Act of 1922
 Patent Act of 1870
 Patent Act of 1952
 Patent and Trademark Law Amendments Act of 1980
 Patent Reform Act of 2005 (not enacted)
 Patent Reform Act of 2007 (not enacted)
 Patent Reform Act of 2009 (currently pending legislation)

See also
List of short titles

References

Act, Patent
Lists of legislation by short title
Patent legislation